The 1965 Los Angeles Dodgers finished the regular-season with a 97–65 record, which earned them the NL pennant by two games over their arch-rivals, the San Francisco Giants. The Dodgers went on to win the World Series in seven games over the Minnesota Twins.

Offseason
October 15, 1964: Nick Willhite was purchased from the Dodgers by the Washington Senators.
October 15, 1964: Larry Miller was traded by the Dodgers to the New York Mets for Dick Smith.
November 30, 1964: Doug Camilli was purchased from the Dodgers by the Washington Senators.
December 4, 1964: Frank Howard, Phil Ortega, Pete Richert and a player to be named later were traded by the Dodgers to the Washington Senators for Claude Osteen, John Kennedy and cash. The Dodgers completed the deal by sending Dick Nen to the Senators on December 15.

Regular season

Season Recap
The Dodgers won the World Series in 1963, but injuries and poor play saw them fall to 6th place in 1964. Despite their weak offense and the trade of power hitting Frank Howard for Claude Osteen during the off season, they were expected to contend in 1965 with their strong pitching. However, one month into the season, they lost their best hitter Tommy Davis when he fractured his ankle sliding into second base. Most experts thought this ended any hope the Dodgers had of winning the pennant. To replace Davis, the club called up journeyman Lou Johnson; his infectious cheerful attitude and knack for timely hitting helped keep the club in contention.

The National League pennant race was a thriller, with 6 teams (the Dodgers, Giants, Pirates, Reds, Braves, and Phillies) in contention throughout a summer that saw the Dodgers, Giants, Braves, and Reds all take their turns in first place.  With these 6 teams tightly bunched heading into September, the Giants went on a 14-game winning streak to take a -game lead with two weeks to play. Then the Dodgers went on a 13-game winning streak, and won 15 of their last 16 games to win the pennant by 2 games over the Giants.

The Dodgers were led by shortstop Maury Wills with 94 stolen bases, Sandy Koufax (26–8, 2.04 E.R.A. and a then record 382 strikeouts), and Don Drysdale (23–12, 2.77 E.R.A.) Drysdale also chipped in with 7 home runs and was the club's only .300 hitter.

Season standings

Record vs. opponents

Opening Day lineup

Notable transactions
May 11, 1965: Nick Willhite was purchased by the Dodgers from the Washington Senators.
December 15, 1965: Dick Tracewski was traded by the Dodgers to the Detroit Tigers for Phil Regan.

Roster

Game log

Regular season 

|-style=background:#cfc
| 1 || April 12 || 11:00a.m. PST || @ Mets || 6–1 || Drysdale (1–0) || Jackson (0–1) || – || 2:23 || 37,999 || 1–0 || W1
|-style=background:#cfc
| 2 || April 14 || 5:15p.m. PST || @ Pirates || 3–1 || Osteen (1–0) || Gibbon (0–1) || – || 1:58 || 7,770 || 2–0 || W2
|-style=background:#bbb
| – || April 15 || || @ Pirates || colspan=8 | Postponed (Rain) (Makeup date: July 11)
|-style=background:#fbb
| 3 || April 17 || 5:05p.m. PST || @ Phillies || 2–3 || Short (2–0) || Drysdale (1–1) || Baldschun (1) || 2:23 || 17,021 || 2–1 || L1
|-style=background:#cfc
| 4 || April 18 || 10:35a.m. PST || @ Phillies || 6–2 || Koufax (1–0) || Belinsky (0–1) || – || 2:43 || 11,107 || 3–1 || W1
|-style=background:#fbb
| 5 || April 20 || 8:00p.m. PST || Mets || 2–3 || Spahn (1–0) || Osteen (1–1) || – || 2:37 || 36,161 || 3–2 || L1
|-style=background:#cfc
| 6 || April 21 || 8:00p.m. PST || Mets || 5–1 || Drysdale (2–1) || Willey (0–1) || Miller (1) || 3:09 || 18,134 || 4–2 || W1
|-style=background:#cfc
| 7 || April 22 || 8:00p.m. PST || Mets || 2–1 || Koufax (2–0) || Fisher (0–1) || – || 2:12 || 20,888 || 5–2 || W2
|-style=background:#cfc
| 8 || April 23 || 8:00p.m. PST || Phillies || 4–0 || Podres (1–0) || Bunning (1–2) || – || 1:58 || 29,120 || 6–2 || W3
|-style=background:#cfc
| 9 || April 24 || 8:00p.m. PST || Phillies || 9–3 || Osteen (2–1) || Belinsky (0–2) || – || 2:47 || 36,500 || 7–2 || W4
|-style=background:#fbb
| 10 || April 25 || 1:00p.m. PDT || Phillies || 4–6 || Herbert (1–0) || Drysdale (2–2) || Baldschun (2) || 2:42 || 25,766 || 7–3 || L1
|-style=background:#fbb
| 11 || April 26 || 8:00p.m. PDT || Phillies || 3–4 || Short (3–1) || Koufax (2–1) || Baldschun (3) || 3:00 || 24,703 || 7–4 || L2
|-style=background:#cfc
| 12 || April 27 || 8:00p.m. PDT || Pirates || 5–4 || Reed (1–0) || Gibbon (0–3) || Miller (2) || 2:54 || 17,630 || 8–4 || W1
|-style=background:#fbb
| 13 || April 28 || 8:00p.m. PDT || Pirates || 0–2 || Veale (2–0) || Osteen (2–2) || – || 2:05 || 17,464 || 8–5 || L1
|-style=background:#cfc
| 14 || April 29 || 8:00p.m. PDT || Giants || 2–1 || Drysdale (3–2) || Marichal (3–2) || – || 2:13 || 30,219 || 9–5 || W1
|-style=background:#cfc
| 15 || April 30 || 8:00p.m. PDT || Giants || 6–3 || Miller (1–0) || Bolin (0–3) || – || 3:02 || 48,586 || 10–5 || W2
|-

|-style=background:#cfc
| 16 || May 1 || 8:00p.m. PDT || Giants || 4–2 || Purdin (1–0) || Perry (1–2) || Brewer (1) || 2:27 || 49,758 || 11–5 || W3
|-style=background:#fbb
| 17 || May 2 || 1:00p.m. PDT || Giants || 2–4  || Sanford (2–1) || Miller (1–1) || Linzy (1) || 2:43 || 40,439 || 11–6 || L1
|-style=background:#cfc
| 18 || May 4 || 6:05p.m. PDT || @ Reds || 8–6 || Brewer (1–0) || Jay (1–1) || – || 2:30 || 9,767 || 12–6 || W1
|-style=background:#cfc
| 19 || May 5 || 6:05p.m. PDT || @ Reds || 4–2 || Koufax (3–1) || O'Toole (0–4) || – || 2:38 || 9,753 || 13–6 || W2
|-style=background:#cfc
| 20 || May 6 || 6:05p.m. PDT || @ Reds || 4–3 || Podres (2–0) || Tsitouris (2–2) || Miller (3) || 2:20 || 7,821 || 14–6 || W3
|-style=background:#cfc
| 21 || May 7 || 8:15p.m. PDT || @ Giants || 4–3 || Osteen (3–2) || Henry (2–1) || – || 2:26 || 33,977 || 15–6 || W4
|-style=background:#cfc
| 22 || May 8 || 1:00p.m. PDT || @ Giants || 9–0 || Drysdale (4–2) || Herbel (1–2) || – || 2:22 || 37,548 || 16–6 || W5
|-style=background:#fbb
| 23 || May 9 || 1:00p.m. PDT || @ Giants || 3–6 || Marichal (5–2) || Koufax (3–2) || – || 2:48 || 40,596 || 16–7 || L1
|-style=background:#cfc
| 24 || May 10 || 8:00p.m. PDT || Astros || 3–2  || Miller (2–1) || Woodeshick (1–2) || – || 2:44 || 22,535 || 17–7 || W1
|-style=background:#fbb
| 25 || May 11 || 8:00p.m. PDT || Astros || 1–2 || Giusti (6–0) || Osteen (3–3) || – || 1:57 || 21,086 || 17–8 || L1
|-style=background:#cfc
| 26 || May 12 || 8:00p.m. PDT || Astros || 4–2 || Drysdale (5–2) || Nottebart (0–2) || – || 2:06 || 19,302 || 18–8 || W1
|-style=background:#cfc
| 27 || May 13 || 8:00p.m. PDT || Astros || 3–0 || Koufax (4–2) || Bruce (1–4) || – || 2:05 || 20,963 || 19–8 || W2
|-style=background:#fbb
| 28 || May 14 || 8:00p.m. PDT || Cubs || 1–2 || Buhl (4–2) || Purdin (1–1) || Abernathy (8) || 2:23 || 26,356 || 19–9 || L1
|-style=background:#cfc
| 29 || May 15 || 1:00p.m. PDT || Cubs || 3–1 || Miller (3–1) || Ellsworth (3–3) || Brewer (2) || 2:02 || 22,047 || 20–9 || W1
|-style=background:#fbb
| 30 || May 16  || 1:00p.m. PDT || Cubs || 3–5  || Jackson (3–3) || Perranoski (0–1) || – || 2:38 || || 20–10 || L1
|-style=background:#cfc
| 31 || May 16  || 4:13p.m. PDT || Cubs || 3–2 || Drysdale (6–2) || McDaniel (0–1) || – || 2:22 || 45,739 || 21–10 || W1
|-style=background:#cfc
| 32 || May 17 || 5:30p.m. PDT || @ Astros || 5–3  || Koufax (5–2) || Bruce (1–5) || Miller (4) || 2:59 || 40,858 || 22–10 || W2
|-style=background:#fbb
| 33 || May 18 || 5:30p.m. PDT || @ Astros || 1–4 || Johnson (3–1) || Brewer (1–1) || Woodeshick (2) || 2:07 || 22,220 || 22–11 || L1
|-style=background:#cfc
| 34 || May 19 || 5:30p.m. PDT || @ Astros || 4–2  || Purdin (2–1) || MacKenzie (0–2) || Drysdale (1) || 4:04 || 30,885 || 23–11 || W1
|-style=background:#fbb
| 35 || May 21 || 11:30a.m. PDT || @ Cubs || 3–4 || Ellsworth (4–3) || Drysdale (6–3) || – || 2:22 || 4,716 || 23–12 || L1
|-style=background:#cfc
| 36 || May 22 || 11:30a.m. PDT || @ Cubs || 3–1 || Koufax (6–2) || Koonce (3–2) || – || 2:30 || 17,922 || 24–12 || W1
|-style=background:#fbb
| 37 || May 23 || 11:30a.m. PDT || @ Cubs || 2–3  || Ellsworth (5–3) || Reed (1–1) || – || 4:09 || 17,139 || 24–13 || L1
|-style=background:#fbb
| 38 || May 24 || 8:00p.m. PDT || Cardinals || 4–6 || Stallard (3–1) || Osteen (3–4) || Schultz (1) || 3:11 || 22,987 || 24–14 || L2
|-style=background:#cfc
| 39 || May 25 || 8:00p.m. PDT || Cardinals || 2–0 || Drysdale (7–3) || Gibson (8–1) || – || 1:41 || 28,515 || 25–14 || W1
|-style=background:#fbb
| 40 || May 26 || 8:00p.m. PDT || Cardinals || 1–2 || Simmons (3–5) || Koufax (6–3) || – || 2:26 || 30,794 || 25–15 || L1
|-style=background:#cfc
| 41 || May 27 || || Braves || 3–2 || Podres (3–0) || Lemaster (2–5) || || || 19,001 || 26–15 || 
|-style=background:#fbb
| 42 || May 28 || || Braves || 5–4 || O'Dell (3–2) || Osteen (3–5) || || || 30,107 || 26–16 || 
|-style=background:#cfc
| 43 || May 29 || || Braves || 5–3 || Drysdale (8–3) || Carroll (0–1) || || || 23,707 || 27–16 || 
|-style=background:#cfc
| 44 || May 30 || 1:00p.m. PDT || Reds || 12–5 || Koufax (7–3) || Ellis (7–2) || – || 2:43 || 36,309 || 28–16 || W2
|-style=background:#cfc
| 45 || May 31  || 1:00p.m. PDT|| Reds || 4–3 || Perranoski (1–1) || Maloney (5–1) || – || 2:44 || || 29–16 || W3
|-style=background:#fbb
| 46 || May 31  || 4:19p.m. PDT || Reds || 1–6 || Jay (3–1) || Osteen (3–6) || – || 2:14 || 50,997 || 29–17 || L1
|-

|-style=background:#cfc
| 47 || June 2 || 6:00p.m. PDT || @ Cardinals || 4–1 || Drysdale (9–3) || Washburn (3–3) || Perranoski (1) || 2:46 || 17,560 || 30–17 || W1
|-style=background:#cfc
| 48 || June 3 || 6:00p.m. PDT || @ Cardinals || 11–10 || Brewer (2–1) || Schultz (1–1) || Miller (5) || 3:19 || 19,946 || 31–17 || W2
|-style=background:#fbb
| 49 || June 4 || || @ Braves || 5–2 || Blasingame (6–4) || Miller (3–2) || || || 5,760 || 31–18 || 
|-style=background:#fbb
| 50 || June 5 || || @ Braves || 9–1 || Cloninger (7–4) || Podres (3–1) || || || 4,116 || 31–19 || 
|-style=background:#cfc
| 51 || June 6 || || @ Braves || 4–0 || Drysdale (10–3) || Kelley (0–1) || || || || 32–19 || 
|-style=background:#fbb
| 52 || June 6 || || @ Braves || 6–4 || Lemaster (3–5) || Reed (1–2) || O'Dell (6) || || 17,175 || 32–20 || 
|-style=background:#cfc
| 53 || June 7 || 5:05p.m. PDT || @ Phillies || 14–3 || Koufax (8–3) || Burdette (0–3) || – || 3:02 || 23,345 || 33–20 || W1
|-style=background:#cfc
| 54 || June 8 || 5:05p.m. PDT || @ Phillies || 2–1 || Osteen (4–6) || Bunning (5–5) || Perranoski (2) || 2:49 || 14,975 || 34–20 || W2
|-style=background:#fbb
| 55 || June 9 || 5:05p.m. PDT || @ Phillies || 3–7 || Short (5–6) || Kekich (0–1) || – || 3:01 || 16,241 || 34–21 || L1
|-style=background:#fbb
| 56 || June 10 || 5:05p.m. PDT || @ Phillies || 0–4 || Herbert (3–3) || Podres (3–2) || – || 1:58 || 19,467 || 34–22 || L2
|-style=background:#cfc
| 57 || June 11 || 5:00p.m. PDT || @ Mets || 2–1 || Drysdale (11–3) || Spahn (4–7) || – || 2:16 || 55,023 || 35–22 || W1
|-style=background:#cfc
| 58 || June 12 || 11:15a.m. PDT || @ Mets || 5–0 || Koufax (9–3) || Jackson (2–8) || – || 2:50 || 38,915 || 36–22 || W2
|-style=background:#cfc
| 59 || June 13  || 10:00a.m. PDT || @ Mets || 5–2 || Osteen (5–6) || Fisher (5–6) || Miller (6) || 2:41 || || 37–22 || W3
|-style=background:#cfc
| 60 || June 13  || 1:16p.m. PDT || @ Mets || 4–3 || Perranoski (2–1) || Kroll (3–5) || Podres (1) || 3:25 || 57,175 || 38–22 || W4
|-style=background:#fbb
| 61 || June 15 || 8:00p.m. PDT || Giants || 1–2 || Marichal (10–5) || Drysdale (11–4) || – || 2:16 || 52,357 || 38–23 || L1
|-style=background:#cfc
| 62 || June 16 || 8:00p.m. PDT || Giants || 2–1 || Koufax (10–3) || Shaw (6–4) || – || 2:36 || 44,499 || 39–23 || W1
|-style=background:#cfc
| 63 || June 17 || 8:00p.m. PDT || Giants || 3–0 || Osteen (6–6) || Perry (6–6) || – || 2:24 || 40,707 || 40–23 || W2
|-style=background:#fbb
| 64 || June 18 || 8:00p.m. PDT || Phillies || 2–4 || Short (7–6) || Podres (3–3) || – || 2:23 || 30,401 || 40–24 || L1
|-style=background:#cfc
| 65 || June 19 || 8:00p.m. PDT || Phillies || 4–0 || Willhite (1–0) || Herbert (3–4) || Perranoski (3) || 2:19 || 20,518 || 41–24 || W1
|-style=background:#cfc
| 66 || June 20  || 1:00p.m. PDT || Mets || 2–1 || Koufax (11–3) || Spahn (4–9) || – || 1:52 || || 42–24 || W2
|-style=background:#fbb
| 67 || June 20  || 3:27p.m. PDT || Mets || 2–3 || Miller (1–0) || Drysdale (11–5) || – || 2:30 || 52,248 || 42–25 || L1
|-style=background:#fbb
| 68 || June 21 || 8:00p.m. PDT || Mets || 0–1 || Jackson (3–9) || Osteen (6–7) || – || 1:54 || 18,867 || 42–26 || L2
|-style=background:#cfc
| 69 || June 22 || 8:00p.m. PDT || Mets || 4–2 || Reed (2–2) || Parsons (0–4) || Perranoski (4) || 2:18 || 20,633 || 43–26 || W1
|-style=background:#fbb
| 70 || June 24 || 8:00p.m. PDT || Pirates || 3–13 || Cardwell (5–2) || Drysdale (11–6) || – || 2:33 || 28,867 || 43–27 || L1
|-style=background:#cfc
| 71 || June 25 || 8:00p.m. PDT || Pirates || 4–1 || Koufax (12–3) || Friend (3–6) || – || 2:04 || 32,060 || 44–27 || W1
|-style=background:#fbb
| 72 || June 26 || 1:00p.m. PDT || Pirates || 1–6 || Law (8–5) || Osteen (6–8) || – || 2:28 || 21,769 || 44–28 || L1
|-style=background:#fbb
| 73 || June 27 || 1:00p.m. PDT || Pirates || 2–10 || Veale (8–5) || Podres (3–4) || – || 2:39 || 33,161 || 44–29 || L2
|-style=background:#fbb
| 74 || June 28 || 8:15p.m. PDT || @ Giants || 0–5 || Marichal (12–6) || Drysdale (11–7) || – || 2:38 || 36,702 || 44–30 || L3
|-style=background:#cfc
| 75 || June 29 || 1:00p.m. PDT || @ Giants || 9–3 || Koufax (13–3) || Shaw (7–5) || – || 2:45 || 29,380 || 45–30 || W1
|-style=background:#fbb
| 76 || June 30 || 11:00a.m. PDT || @ Cubs || 1–4 || Ellsworth (9–3) || Osteen (6–9) || – || 2:03 || || 45–31 || L1
|-style=background:#cfc
| 77 || June 30 || 1:38p.m. PDT || @ Cubs || 4–3 || Miller (4–2) || Hoeft (0–1) || – || 2:38 || 17,950 || 46–31 || W1
|-

|-style=background:#fbb
| 78 || July 1 || 11:30a.m. PDT || @ Cubs || 3–6 || McDaniel (3–3) || Podres (3–5) || Abernathy (16) || 2:34 || 7,420 || 46–32 || L1
|-style=background:#fbb
| 79 || July 2 || 5:30p.m. PDT || @ Astros || 3–4 || Cuellar (1–1) || Drysdale (11–8) || – || 2:35 || 33,044 || 46–33 || L2
|-style=background:#cfc
| 80 || July 3 || 5:30p.m. PDT || @ Astros || 3–1 || Koufax (14–3) || Dierker (2–4) || – || 2:10 || 50,136 || 47–33 || W1
|-style=background:#fbb
| 81 || July 4 || 12:30p.m. PDT || @ Astros || 1–3 || Raymond (5–3) || Osteen (6–10) || – || 2:04 || 47,642 || 47–34 || L1
|-style=background:#fbb
| 82 || July 5 || 6:05p.m. PDT || @ Reds || 4–7 || Maloney (9–4) || Miller (4–3) || McCool (8) || 2:29 || 29,047 || 47–35 || L1
|-style=background:#cfc
| 83 || July 6 || 6:05p.m. PDT || @ Reds || 11–7 || Drysdale (12–8) || O'Toole (1–8) || Perranoski (5) || 2:54 || 18,833 || 48–35 || W1
|-style=background:#fbb
| 84 || July 7 || 6:05p.m. PDT || @ Reds || 6–7 || Nuxhall (4–2) || Miller (4–4) || – || 2:58 || 25,785 || 48–36 || L1
|-style=background:#cfc
| 85 || July 8 || 4:30p.m. PDT || @ Pirates || 9–4 || Reed (3–2) || Law (8–8) || – || 2:59 || 22,247 || 49–36 || W1
|-style=background:#fbb
| 86 || July 9 || 5:15p.m. PDT || @ Pirates || 1–4 || Veale (9–6) || Willhite (1–1) || – || 2:29 || 16,284 || 49–37 || L1
|-style=background:#cfc
| 87 || July 10 || 11:15a.m. PDT || @ Pirates || 8–4 || Drysdale (13–8) || Cardwell (8–3) || Perranoski (6) || 2:57 || 14,880 || 50–37 || W1
|-style=background:#cfc
| 88 || July 11  || 10:00a.m. PDT || @ Pirates || 4–2 || Koufax (15–3) || Gibbon (2–8) || – || 2:29 || || 51–37 || W2
|-style=background:#fbb
| 89 || July 11  || 1:04p.m. PDT || @ Pirates || 3–4  || Carpin (3–0) || Miller (4–5) || – || 2:42 || 37,631 || 51–38 || L1
|-style=background:#bbbfff
| – || July 13 || || 36th All-Star Game || colspan=8 | National League vs. American League (Metropolitan Stadium, Bloomington, Minnesota)
|-style=background:#cfc
| 90 || July 15 || 8:00p.m. PDT || Cubs || 5–0 || Drysdale (14–8) || Ellsworth (10–5) || – || 2:19 || 25,538 || 52–38 || W1
|-style=background:#cfc
| 91 || July 16 || 8:00p.m. PDT || Cubs || 3–0 || Koufax (16–3) || Jackson (8–11) || – || 2:20 || 47,947 || 53–38 || W2
|-style=background:#cfc
| 92 || July 17 || 8:00p.m. PDT || Cubs || 7–2 || Osteen (7–10) || Koonce (7–8) || – || 2:21 || 31,228 || 54–38 || W3
|-style=background:#cfc
| 93 || July 18 || 1:00p.m. PDT || Cubs || 4–3  || Reed (4–2) || Hendley (0–2) || – || 3:05 || 27,508 || 55–38 || W4
|-style=background:#cfc
| 94 || July 19 || 8:00p.m. PDT || Astros || 8–3 || Drysdale (15–8) || Nottebart (1–7) || – || 2:34 || 22,756 || 56–38 || W5
|-style=background:#cfc
| 95 || July 20 || 8:00p.m. PDT || Astros || 3–2 || Koufax (17–3) || Taylor (2–4) || – || 2:15 || 30,937 || 57–38 || W6
|-style=background:#fbb
| 96 || July 21 || || Braves || 6–4 || Blasingame (11–7) || Osteen (7–11) || O'Dell (10) || || 28,721 || 57–39 || 
|-style=background:#fbb
| 97 || July 22 || || Braves || 5–2 || Cloninger (12–8) || Miller (4–6) || O'Dell (11) || || 27,179 || 57–40 || 
|-style=background:#fbb
| 98 || July 23 || 8:00p.m. PDT || Cardinals || 3–4  || Washburn (6–7) || Willhite (1–2) || – || 3:48 || 40,286 || 57–41 || L3
|-style=background:#fbb
| 99 || July 24 || 8:00p.m. PDT || Cardinals || 2–3  || Dennis (2–1) || Perranoski (2–2) || Woodeshick (12) || 3:04 || 48,998 || 57–42 || L4
|-style=background:#cfc
| 100 || July 25 || 1:00p.m. PDT || Cardinals || 5–1 || Osteen (8–11) || Simmons (6–10) || – || 2:44 || 31,710 || 58–42 || W1
|-style=background:#cfc
| 101 || July 26 || 8:00p.m. PDT || Reds || 5–4 || Podres (4–5) || Maloney (11–5) || Perranoski (7) || 2:20 || 39,978 || 59–42 || W2
|-style=background:#cfc
| 102 || July 27 || 8:00p.m. PDT || Reds || 9–7 || Perranoski (3–2) || Jay (8–3) || – || 3:25 || 46,537 || 60–42 || W3
|-style=background:#fbb
| 103 || July 28 || 8:00p.m. PDT || Reds || 1–4 || Ellis (14–6) || Koufax (17–4) || – || 2:00 || 53,604 || 60–43 || L1
|-style=background:#cfc
| 104 || July 30 || 6:00p.m. PDT || @ Cardinals || 4–2 || Miller (5–6) || Dennis (2–2) || Perranoski (8) || 2:39 || 29,497 || 61–43 || W1
|-style=background:#fbb
| 105 || July 31 || 6:00p.m. PDT || @ Cardinals || 3–4 || Gibson (13–8) || Perranoski (3–3) || – || 2:31 || 30,109 || 61–44 || L1
|-

|-style=background:#cfc
| 106 || August 1 || 11:15a.m. PDT || @ Cardinals || 3–2 || Koufax (18–4) || Sadecki (2–9) || – || 2:29 || 30,605 || 62–44 || W1
|-style=background:#fbb
| 107 || August 2 || 6:00p.m. PDT || @ Cardinals || 5–6 || Stallard (8–4) || Perranoski (3–4) || Dennis (6) || 2:34 || 20,518 || 62–45 || L1
|-style=background:#bbb
| – || August 3 || || @ Braves || colspan=8 | Postponed (Inclement weather) (Makeup date: August 4)
|-style=background:#fbb
| 108 || August 4 || || @ Braves || 4–3 || Fischer (5–5) || Drysdale (15–9) || O'Dell (15) || || || 62–46 || 
|-style=background:#cfc
| 109 || August 4 || || @ Braves || 3–2 || Osteen (9–11) || Lemaster (4–9) || Miller (7) || || 19,950 || 63–46 || 
|-style=background:#cfc
| 110 || August 5 || || @ Braves || 6–3 || Koufax (19–4) || Blasingame (13–8) || || || 18,368 || 64–46 || 
|-style=background:#fbb
| 111 || August 6 || 6:05p.m. PDT || @ Reds || 4–5  || McCool (7–6) || Perranoski (3–5) || – || 3:26 || 25,668 || 64–47 || L1
|-style=background:#cfc
| 112 || August 7 || 5:05p.m. PDT || @ Reds || 5–3 || Reed (5–2) || Ellis (14–7) || Perranoski (9) || 2:37 || 27,844 || 65–47 || W1
|-style=background:#fbb
| 113 || August 8 || 10:30a.m. PDT || @ Reds || 0–18 || Maloney (13–5) || Drysdale (15–10) || – || 2:20 || 28,335 || 65–48 || L1
|-style=background:#cfc
| 114 || August 10 || 8:00p.m. PDT || Mets || 4–3 || Koufax (20–4) || Jackson (5–16) || – || 2:07 || 36,815 || 66–48 || W2
|-style=background:#cfc
| 115 || August 11 || 8:00p.m. PDT || Mets || 1–0 || Drysdale (16–10) || Richardson (0–1) || – || 2:34 || 23,376 || 67–48 || W3
|-style=background:#cfc
| 116 || August 13 || 8:00p.m. PDT || Pirates || 3–1 || Osteen (10–11) || Veale (12–9) || – || 2:21 || 32,551 || 68–48 || W4
|-style=background:#cfc
| 117 || August 14 || 8:00p.m. PDT || Pirates || 1–0  || Koufax (21–4) || Cardwell (10–7) || – || 2:43 || 29,237 || 69–48 || W5
|-style=background:#fbb
| 118 || August 15 || 1:00p.m. PDT || Pirates || 2–4 || Sisk (4–2) || Drysdale (16–11) || McBean (13) || 3:02 || 25,175 || 69–49 || L1
|-style=background:#fbb
| 119 || August 16 || 8:00p.m. PDT || Phillies || 1–6 || Short (14–8) || Podres (4–6) || – || 2:47 || 22,611 || 69–50 || L2
|-style=background:#cfc
| 120 || August 17 || 8:00p.m. PDT || Phillies || 4–2 || Osteen (11–11) || Herbert (5–6) || Perranoski (10) || 2:31 || 23,144 || 70–50 || W1
|-style=background:#fbb
| 121 || August 18 || 8:00p.m. PDT || Phillies || 3–6  || Wagner (5–3) || Brewer (2–2) || – || 4:05 || 38,267 || 70–51 || L1
|-style=background:#cfc
| 122 || August 19 || 8:15p.m. PDT || @ Giants || 8–5  || Perranoski (4–5) || Perry (8–11) || – || 4:11 || 35,901 || 71–51 || W1
|-style=background:#fbb
| 123 || August 20 || 8:15p.m. PDT || @ Giants || 5–1 || Shaw (14–6) || Reed (5–3) || – || 2:38 || 41,858 || 71–52 || L1
|-style=background:#cfc
| 124 || August 21 || 1:00p.m. PDT || @ Giants || 6–4  || Podres (5–6) || Henry (3–2) || – || 3:27 || 42,283 || 72–52 || W1
|-style=background:#fbb
| 125 || August 22 || 1:00p.m. PDT || @ Giants || 3–4 || Herbel (8–6) || Koufax (21–5) || Murakami (5) || 2:18 || 42,807 || 72–53 || L1
|-style=background:#cfc
| 126 || August 23 || 5:00p.m. PDT || @ Mets || 8–4 || Drysdale (17–11) || Miller (1–3) || Miller (8) || 2:59 || 33,393 || 73–53 || W1
|-style=background:#fbb
| 127 || August 24 || 5:00p.m. PDT || @ Mets || 3–4 || Eilers (1–0) || Miller (5–7) || – || 2:34 || 37,023 || 73–54 || L1
|-style=background:#fbb
| 128 || August 25 || 5:00p.m. PDT || @ Mets || 5–7 || Richardson (2–1) || Osteen (11–12) || – || 2:38 || 32,432 || 73–55 || L2
|-style=background:#fbb
| 129 || August 26 || 5:00p.m. PDT || @ Mets || 2–5 || McGraw (2–2) || Koufax (21–6) || Fisher (1) || 2:24 || 45,950 || 73–56 || L3
|-style=background:#cfc
| 130 || August 27 || 5:05p.m. PDT || @ Phillies || 9–8 || Drysdale (18–11) || Herbert (5–7) || Reed (1) || 3:16 || 26,740 || 74–56 || W1
|-style=background:#cfc
| 131 || August 28 || 5:05p.m. PDT || @ Phillies || 8–4 || Brewer (3–2) || Short (14–9) || Koufax (1) || 3:16 || 27,439 || 75–56 || W2
|-style=background:#fbb
| 132 || August 29 || 10:35a.m. PDT || @ Phillies || 3–13 || Culp (9–9) || Osteen (11–13) || – || 2:39 || 21,744 || 75–57 || L1
|-style=background:#bbb
| – || August 31 || || @ Pirates || colspan=8 | Postponed (Rain) (Makeup date: September 1)
|-

|-style=background:#fbb
| 133 || September 1  || 2:30p.m. PDT || @ Pirates || 2–3  || Gibbon (4–9) || Koufax (21–7) || – || 3:00 || || 75–58 || L2
|-style=background:#fbb
| 134 || September 1  || 6:05p.m. PDT || @ Pirates || 1–2 || Law (16–9) || Drysdale (18–12) || – || 2:18 || 26,394 || 75–59 || L3
|-style=background:#cfc
| 135 || September 2 || 5:15p.m. PDT || @ Pirates || 7–1 || Osteen (12–13) || Veale (14–10) || Perranoski (11) || 2:38 || 29,200 || 76–59 || W1
|-style=background:#cfc
| 136 || September 3 || 5:30p.m. PDT || @ Astros || 3–0 || Willhite (2–2) || Nottebart (4–13) || Perranoski (12) || 2:14 || 31,154 || 77–59 || W2
|-style=background:#cfc
| 137 || September 4 || 11:15a.m. PDT || @ Astros || 5–0 || Podres (6–6) || Bruce (9–17) || Perranoski (13) || 2:13 || 41,951 || 78–59 || W3
|-style=background:#cfc
| 138 || September 5 || 12:30p.m. PDT || @ Astros || 4–2 || Reed (4–2) || Roberts (4–1) || – || 2:05 || 49,442 || 79–59 || W4
|-style=background:#fbb
| 139 || September 6 || 1:00p.m. PDT || Giants || 6–7  || Linzy (7–2) || Reed (6–4) || – || 3:43 || 53,581 || 79–60 || L1
|-style=background:#fbb
| 140 || September 7 || 6:00p.m. PDT || Giants || 1–3 || Shaw (15–8) || Osteen (12–14) || Murakami (7) || 2:48 || 48,586 || 79–61 || L2
|-style=background:#cfc
| 141 || September 9 || 8:00p.m. PDT || Cubs || 1–0 || Koufax (22–7) || Hendley (2–3) || – || 1:43 || 29,139 || 80–61 || W1
|-style=background:#cfc
| 142 || September 10 || 8:00p.m. PDT || Astros || 5–2 || Drysdale (19–12) || Roberts (4–2) || Perranoski (14) || 2:00 || 30,200 || 81–61 || W2
|-style=background:#cfc
| 143 || September 11 || 8:00p.m. PDT || Astros || 8–3 || Osteen (13–14) || Farrell (10–10) || Perranoski (15) || 2:32 || 30,278 || 82–61 || W3
|-style=background:#fbb
| 144 || September 12 || 1:00p.m. PDT || Astros || 2–3 || Owens (6–4) || Perranoski (4–6) || Raymond (4) || 2:40 || 21,918 || 82–62 || L1
|-style=background:#fbb
| 145 || September 14 || 11:30a.m. PDT || @ Cubs || 1–2 || Hendley (3–3) || Koufax (22–8) || – || 1:57 || 6,220 || 82–63 || L2
|-style=background:#fbb
| 146 || September 15 || 11:30a.m. PDT || @ Cubs || 6–8 || Ellsworth (14–14) || Reed (6–5) || Hoeft (1) || 2:45 || 1,886 || 82–64 || L3
|-style=background:#cfc
| 147 || September 16 || 11:30a.m. PDT || @ Cubs || 2–0 || Osteen (14–14) || Faul (5–5) || Koufax (2) || 2:15 || 550 || 83–64 || W1
|-style=background:#cfc
| 148 || September 17 || 6:00p.m. PDT || @ Cardinals || 3–2 || Drysdale (20–12) || Simmons (9–15) || Perranoski (16) || 2:36 || 19,042 || 84–64 || W2
|-style=background:#cfc
| 149 || September 18 || 6:00p.m. PDT || @ Cardinals || 1–0 || Koufax (23–8) || Washburn (9–11) || – || 2:11 || 29,063 || 85–64 || W3
|-style=background:#cfc
| 150 || September 19 || 11:15a.m. PDT || @ Cardinals || 5–0 || Osteen (15–14) || Gibson (18–11) || Perranoski (17) || 2:33 || 23,941 || 86–64 || W4
|-style=background:#cfc
| 151 || September 21 || || @ Braves || 3–1 || Drysdale (21–12) || Lemaster (6–13) || || || 5,169 || 87–64 || 
|-style=background:#cfc
| 152 || September 22 || || @ Braves || 7 – 6 (11) || Perranoski (5–6) || Olivo (0–1) || Miller (9) || || 12,577 || 88–64 || 
|-style=background:#cfc
| 153 || September 24 || 8:00p.m. PDT || Cardinals || 4–3 || Perranoski (6–6) || Gibson (18–12) || – || 2:38 || 37,450 || 89–64 || W7
|-style=background:#cfc
| 154 || September 25 || 1:00p.m. PDT || Cardinals || 2–0 || Koufax (24–8) || Briles (2–3) || – || 2:10 || 31,532 || 90–64 || W8
|-style=background:#cfc
| 155 || September 26 || 1:00p.m. PDT || Cardinals || 1–0 || Drysdale (22–12) || Sadecki (6–14) || – || 2:18 || 40,317 || 91–64 || W9
|-style=background:#cfc
| 156 || September 27 || 8:00p.m. PDT || Reds || 6–1 || Podres (7–6) || Ellis (21–10) || Perranoski (18) || 2:31 || 32,593 || 92–64 || W10
|-style=background:#cfc
| 157 || September 28 || 8:00p.m. PDT || Reds || 2–1  || Reed (7–5) || Jay (9–8) || – || 3:52 || 38,424 || 93–64 || W11
|-style=background:#cfc
| 158 || September 29 || 6:00p.m. PDT || Reds || 5–0 || Koufax (25–8) || Maloney (20–9) || – || 2:20 || 52,312 || 94–64 || W12
|-style=background:#cfc
| 159 || September 30 || || Braves || 4–0 || Drysdale (23–12) || Fischer (8–9) || || || 36,006 || 95–64 || 
|-

|-style=background:#fbb
| 160 || October 1 || || Braves || 2–0 || Lemaster (7–13) || Osteen (15–15) || || || 50,813 || 95–65 || 
|-style=background:#cfc
| 161 || October 2 || || Braves || 3–1 || Koufax (26–8) || Cloninger (24–11) || || || 41,574 || 96–65 || 
|-style=background:#cfc
| 162 || October 3 || || Braves || 3–0 || Miller (6–7) || Sadowski (5–9) || Willhite (1) || || 39,922 || 97–65 || 
|-

|- style="text-align:center;"
| Legend:       = Win       = Loss       = PostponementBold = Dodgers team member

Postseason Game log 

|-style=background:#fbb
| 1 || October 6 || 12Noon PDT || @ Twins || L 2–8 || Grant (1–0) || Drysdale (0–1) || – || 2:29 || 47,797 || 0–1 || L1
|-style=background:#fbb
| 2 || October 7 || 12Noon PDT || @ Twins || L 1–5 || Kaat (1–0) || Koufax (0–1) || – || 2:13 || 48,700 || 0–2 || L2
|-style=background:#cfc
| 3 || October 9 || 1:00p.m. PDT || Twins || W 4–0 || Osteen (1–0) || Pascual (0–1) || – || 2:06 || 55,934 || 1–2 || W1
|-style=background:#cfc
| 4 || October 10 || 1:00p.m. PDT || Twins || W 7–2 || Drysdale (1–1) || Grant (1–1) || – || 2:15 || 55,920 || 2–2 || W2
|-style=background:#cfc
| 5 || October 11 || 1:00p.m. PDT || Twins || W 7–0 || Koufax (1–1) || Kaat (1–1) || – || 2:34 || 55,801 || 3–2 || W3
|-style=background:#fbb
| 6 || October 13 || 12Noon PDT || @ Twins || L 1–5 || Grant (2–1) || Osteen (1–1) || – || 2:16 || 49,578 || 3–3 || L1
|-style=background:#cfc
| 7 || October 14 || 12Noon PDT || @ Twins || W 2–0 || Koufax (2–1) || Kaat (1–2) || – || 2:27 || 50,976 || 4–3 || W1
|-

|- style="text-align:center;"
| Legend:       = Win       = Loss       = PostponementBold = Dodgers team member

Player stats 
Note: Team batting and pitching leaders are in bold.

Batting

Starters by position 
Note: Pos = Position; G = Games played; PA = Plate appearances; AB = At bats; R = Runs scored; H = Hits; 2B = Doubles hit; 3B = Triples hit; HR = Home runs; RBI = Runs batted in; SB = Stolen bases; CS = Caught stealing; BB = Walks; SO = Strikeouts; Avg. = Batting average; OBP = On-base percentage; SLG = Slugging; OPS = On Base + Slugging; TB = Total bases; GDP = Grounded into double play; HBP = Hit by pitch; SH = Sacrifice hits; SF = Sacrifice flies; IBB = Intentional base on balls

Other batters 
Note: G = Games played; AB = At bats; H = Hits; Avg. = Batting average; HR = Home runs; RBI = Runs batted in

Pitching

Starting pitchers
Note: G = Games pitched; IP = Innings pitched; W = Wins; L = Losses; ERA = Earned run average; SO = Strikeouts

Other pitchers
Note: G = Games pitched; IP = Innings pitched; W = Wins; L = Losses; ERA = Earned run average; SO = Strikeouts

Relief pitchers
Note: G = Games pitched; W = Wins; L = Losses; SV = Saves; ERA = Earned run average; SO = Strikeouts

1965 World Series

Game 1
October 6, 1965, at Metropolitan Stadium in Bloomington, Minnesota

Game 2
October 7, 1965, at Metropolitan Stadium in Bloomington, Minnesota

Game 3
October 9, 1965, at Dodger Stadium in Los Angeles

Game 4
October 10, 1965, at Dodger Stadium in Los Angeles

Game 5
October 11, 1965, at Dodger Stadium in Los Angeles

Game 6
October 13, 1965, at Metropolitan Stadium in Bloomington, Minnesota

Game 7
October 14, 1965, at Metropolitan Stadium in Bloomington, Minnesota

Awards and honors

National League Cy Young Award
Sandy Koufax
National League Rookie of the Year
Jim Lefebvre
World Series Most Valuable Player
Sandy Koufax
Associated Press Athlete of the Year
Sandy Koufax
TSN Pitcher of the Year Award
Sandy Koufax
TSN Major League Player of the Year Award
Sandy Koufax

All-Stars
1965 Major League Baseball All-Star Game
Maury Wills starter
Don Drysdale reserve
Sandy Koufax reserve
TSN National League All-Star
Sandy Koufax
Maury Wills

Farm system

LEAGUE CHAMPIONS: Albuquerque

1965 Major League Baseball draft
This was the first Major League Baseball draft. The Dodgers drafted 30 players this year in the June draft and an additional 2 in the August Legion draft. The first player the Dodgers ever drafted was a shortstop from Bakersfield High School named John Wyatt. He played in the teams farm system through 1970 but never advanced past Class-A.

The most notable player drafted this year was Tom Seaver, who was picked in the 10th round from the University of Southern California, but he did not sign with the team and re-entered the draft the following year, where he was selected by the New York Mets.

Notes

References
Baseball-Reference season page
Baseball Almanac season page

External links
Los Angeles Dodgers 1965 uniform
Los Angeles Dodgers official web site

Los Angeles Dodgers seasons
National League champion seasons
World Series champion seasons
Los Angeles Dodgers season
Los Angel